Tin Brook, also known as Carr Brook or Hempshaw Brook earlier in its course, is a culverted stream in Stockport. The Brook is a minor tributary to the River Mersey.

Etymology
The name possibly originates from the Old English tȳnan, 'to enclose'.

History

Before the 20th century
Hempshaw Brook cut a deep valley in Little Underbank on its southwestern side, through erosion of the areas red sandstone. Located at both ends of the valley was a carr, which enhanced the areas natural defencibility.

According to tradition, the Brook was described as a clear and crystal stream flowing down a valley, that was crossed nearby Lower Hillgate through a paved way allowing carriages to pass through, and stepping stones for passengers.

By 1718, the Brook was crossed by the 'Brook Bridge' located in Lower Hillgate, which became known as the 'Schole-House Bridge' in 1744. The Tin Brook's original outfall, located between the present day Chestergate Tavern and Primark building in the Merseyway Shopping Centre, was built in the mid-eighteenth century.

As early as 1744, authority was obtained to place a dam on the section of what would later be known as the Carr Valley, to power silk mills. The mill was built in 1759, and was powered by the High Carr Dam. Thomas Hope bought the land in the 1790s, and constructed a series of cotton mills across the valley.

In 1835, Hempshaw Brook Brewery was constructed, damming the Brook to create a reservoir.

Stockport Cemetery was opened on the banks of the Brook in 1838, eventually expanding over the Brook, which was covered by a brick tunnel.

By 1872, the Hempshaw Brook Brewery had expanded and built over the reservoir, culverting it with a brick tunnel.

Post-industrial revolution
In the 1967 Stockport air disaster, a Canadair C-4 Argonaut struck a substation overlooking the Brook, killing 72 passengers and leaving with critical injuries. Following a flood, the rest of the Brook in Merseyway was culverted during the rebuilding of Chestergate.

In 1995, a new flood outlet sewer was built to prevent storm water and sewage from backing up, further moving the brook's outfall east.

Course
The Brook rises in either Woodsmoor, Great Moor or Heavily.

The stream flows northwest toward Stockport Cemetery, where it is joined by the Brown House Fold Brook and flows toward the Carr Valley, where the Brook is locally known as the Carr Brook.

The Carr Brook flows northwest underneath Wellington Street, where it becomes known as the Tin Brook. A flood outlet sewer built in 1995 relocated the Brook's outfall underneath the Merseyway Shopping Centre.

References

External links
Stockport Navigation, The Industrial History of Britain.

Rivers of Greater Manchester
Mersey catchment